The Gulf of Tolo ( or ), also known as the Bay of Tolo, is the body of water lying between the eastern and south-eastern peninsulas of the island of Sulawesi (Celebes) in Indonesia.

Unlike the Gulf of Tomini to its north or the Gulf of Boni to its south-west, the Bay of Tolo is not recognized as a gulf by the International Hydrographic Organization. Instead, it is included in the area of the Banda Sea.

See also

Gulf of Tomini
Gulf of Boni

References

Citations

Bibliography
 .

Bays of Indonesia
Molucca Sea